Sulbentine (or dibenzthione) is an antifungal.

References 

Antifungals
Sulfur heterocycles
Dithiocarbamates
Nitrogen heterocycles
Heterocyclic compounds with 1 ring